Grete Meisel-Hess (18 April 1879, Prague - 18 April 1922, Berlin) was an Austrian Jewish feminist, who wrote novels, short stories and essays about women's need for sexual liberation.

Meisel-Hess lived in Vienna from 1893 to 1908. She viewed both anti-Semitism and anti-feminism as signs of degeneration which needed to be overcome by progressive politics.

She wrote for Franz Pfemfert's journal Die Aktion.

Works

 Die sexuelle Krise. Eine sozialpsychologische Untersuchung, 1909. Translated by Eden and Cedar Paul as The sexual crisis: a critique of our sex life, 1917.
 Die Intellektuellen [The Intellectuals], 1911
 Sexuelle Rechte, 1914
 Betrachtungen zur Frauenfrage, 1914
 Die Bedeutung der Monogamie, 1916

Secondary Literature
 Helga Thorson, Grete Meisel-Hess: The New Woman and the Sexual Crisis. Rochester, New York: Camden House, 2022.

References

External links
 
 

1879 births
1922 deaths
Austrian women writers
Austrian feminists
Jewish women writers